The Journal of Astronomical History and Heritage is a peer-reviewed academic journal. As of 2021, the journal is published four times per year. It is logged through the Astrophysics Data System. It publishes research papers, reviews, short communications, IAU reports, and book reviews on all aspects of astronomical history. The editor-in-chief is Wayne Orchiston (National Astronomical Research Institute of Thailand). As of 2021 the associate editors are Clifford Cunningham, Duane Hamacher, James Lequeux, and Peter Robertson, and Ruby-Anne Dela Cruz is the Papers Editor.

It was established in 1998 by John Luis Perdrix, after the Australian Journal of Astronomy was discontinued. Until 2005, it was published by Astral Press, a publishing house founded and owned by Perdrix. From 2005 to 2012 it was published by the Centre for Astronomy (James Cook University). Since 2013, the publishing institute is the National Astronomical Research Institute of Thailand. All papers are now published electronically and all papers from 1998 to the present can be accessed through the journal's website.

References

External links 
 

History of astronomy journals
Triannual journals
James Cook University
English-language journals
Publications with year of establishment missing
Academic journals published by non-profit organizations
Publications established in 1998